In Greek mythology, Medusa (Ancient Greek: Μέδουσα "guardian, protectress"), also called Gorgo, was one of the three monstrous Gorgons, generally described as winged human females with living venomous snakes in place of hair.  Those who gazed into her eyes would turn to stone. Most sources describe her as the daughter of Phorcys and Ceto, although the author Hyginus makes her the daughter of Gorgon and Ceto.

Medusa was beheaded by the Greek hero Perseus, who then used her head, which retained its ability to turn onlookers to stone, as a weapon until he gave it to the goddess Athena to place on her shield. In classical antiquity, the image of the head of Medusa appeared in the evil-averting device known as the Gorgoneion.

According to Hesiod and Aeschylus, she lived and died on Sarpedon, somewhere near Cisthene. The 2nd-century BC novelist Dionysios Skytobrachion puts her somewhere in Libya, where Herodotus had said the Berbers originated her myth as part of their religion.

Mythology

The three Gorgon sisters—Medusa, Stheno, and Euryale—were all children of the ancient marine deities Phorcys (or "Phorkys") and his sister Ceto (or "Keto"), chthonic monsters from an archaic world. Their genealogy is shared with other sisters, the Graeae, as in Aeschylus's Prometheus Bound, which places both trios of sisters far off "on Kisthene's dreadful plain":

Near them their sisters three, the Gorgons, winged
With snakes for hair—hatred of mortal man

While ancient Greek vase-painters and relief carvers imagined Medusa and her sisters as having monstrous form, sculptors and vase-painters of the fifth century BC began to envisage her as being beautiful as well as terrifying. In an ode written in 490 BC, Pindar already speaks of "fair-cheeked Medusa".

In a late version of the Medusa myth, by the Roman poet Ovid (Metamorphoses 4.794–803), Medusa was originally a beautiful maiden,  but when Neptune/Poseidon had sex with   her in Minerva/Athena's temple, Minerva punished Medusa by transforming her beautiful hair into horrible snakes. Although no earlier version speaks of rape, ancient depictions of Medusa as a beautiful maiden instead of a horrid monster predate Ovid. In classical Greek art, the depiction of Medusa shifted from hideous beast to an attractive young woman, both aggressor and victim, a tragic figure in her death. The earliest of those depictions comes courtesy of Polygnotus, who drew Medusa as a comely woman sleeping peacefully as Perseus beheads her. As the act of killing a beautiful maiden in her sleep is rather unheroic, it is not clear whether those vases are meant to elicit sympathy for Medusa's fate, or to mock the traditional hero.

In most versions of the story, she was beheaded by the hero Perseus, who was sent to fetch her head by King Polydectes of Seriphus because Polydectes wanted to marry Perseus's mother. The gods were well aware of this, and Perseus received help. He received a mirrored shield from Athena, sandals with gold wings from Hermes, a sword from Hephaestus and Hades's helm of invisibility. Since Medusa was the only one of the three Gorgons who was mortal, Perseus was able to slay her while looking at the reflection from the mirrored shield he received from Athena. During that time, Medusa was pregnant by Poseidon. When Perseus beheaded her, Pegasus, a winged horse, and Chrysaor, a giant wielding a golden sword, sprang from her body.

Jane Ellen Harrison argues that "her potency only begins when her head is severed, and that potency resides in the head; she is in a word a mask with a body later appended... the basis of the Gorgoneion is a cultus object, a ritual mask misunderstood." In the Odyssey xi, Homer does not specifically mention the Gorgon Medusa:

Lest for my daring Persephone the dread,
From Hades should send up an awful monster's grisly head.

Harrison's translation states that "the Gorgon was made out of the terror, not the terror out of the Gorgon."

According to Ovid, in northwest Africa, Perseus flew past the Titan Atlas, who stood holding the sky aloft, and transformed Atlas into a stone when Atlas tried to attack him. In a similar manner, the corals of the Red Sea were said to have been formed of Medusa's blood spilled onto seaweed when Perseus laid down the petrifying head beside the shore during his short stay in Ethiopia where he saved and wed his future wife, the lovely princess Andromeda, who was the most beautiful woman in the world at that time. Furthermore, the venomous vipers of the Sahara, in the Argonautica 4.1515, Ovid's Metamorphoses 4.770 and Lucan's Pharsalia 9.820, were said to have grown from spilt drops of her blood. The blood of Medusa also spawned the Amphisbaena (a horned dragon-like creature with a snake-headed tail).

Perseus then flew to Seriphos, where his mother was being forced into marriage with the king, Polydectes, who was turned into stone by the head. Then Perseus gave the Gorgon's head to Athena, who placed it on her shield, the Aegis.

Some classical references refer to three Gorgons; Harrison considered that the tripling of Medusa into a trio of sisters was a secondary feature in the myth:

Modern interpretations

Historical

Several early classics scholars interpreted the myth of Medusa as a quasi-historical – "based on or reconstructed from an event, custom, style, etc., in the past", or "sublimated" memory of an actual invasion.

According to Joseph Campbell:

Psychoanalysis
In 1940, Sigmund Freud's "Das Medusenhaupt (Medusa's Head)" was published posthumously. In Freud's interpretation: "To decapitate = to castrate. The terror of Medusa is thus a terror of castration that is linked to the sight of something. Numerous analyses have made us familiar with the occasion for this: it occurs when a boy, who has hitherto been unwilling to believe the threat of castration, catches sight of the female genitals, probably those of an adult, surrounded by hair, and essentially those of his mother." In this perspective the "ravishingly beautiful" Medusa (see above) is the mother remembered in innocence; before the mythic truth of castration dawns on the subject. Classic Medusa, in contrast, is an Oedipal/libidinous symptom. Looking at the forbidden mother (in her hair-covered genitals, so to speak) stiffens the subject in illicit desire and freezes him in terror of the Father's retribution. There are no recorded instances of Medusa turning a woman to stone.

Archetypal literary criticism continues to find psychoanalysis useful. Beth Seelig chooses to interpret Medusa's punishment as resulting from rape rather than the common interpretation of having willingly consented in Athena's temple, as an outcome of the goddess' unresolved conflicts with her own father Zeus.

Feminism
In the 20th century, feminists reassessed Medusa's appearances in literature and in modern culture, including the use of Medusa as a logo by fashion company Versace. The name "Medusa" itself is often used in ways not directly connected to the mythological figure but to suggest the gorgon's abilities or to connote malevolence; despite her origins as a beauty, the name in common usage "came to mean monster." The book Female Rage: Unlocking Its Secrets, Claiming Its Power by Mary Valentis and Anne Devane notes that "When we asked women what female rage looks like to them, it was always Medusa, the snaky-haired monster of myth, who came to mind ... In one interview after another we were told that Medusa is 'the most horrific woman in the world' ... [though] none of the women we interviewed could remember the details of the myth."

Medusa's visage has since been adopted by many women as a symbol of female rage; one of the first publications to express this idea was a feminist journal called Women: A Journal of Liberation in their issue one, volume six for 1978. The cover featured the image of the Gorgon Medusa by Froggi Lupton, which the editors on the inside cover explained "can be a map to guide us through our terrors, through the depths of our anger into the sources of our power as women."

In issue three, Fall 1986 for the magazine Woman of Power an article called Gorgons: A Face for Contemporary Women's Rage, appeared, written by Emily Erwin Culpepper, who wrote that "The Amazon Gorgon face is female fury personified. The Gorgon/Medusa image has been rapidly adopted by large numbers of feminists who recognize her as one face of our own rage." Griselda Pollock analyses the passage from horrorism to compassion in the figure of the Medusa through Adriana Cavarero's philosophy and Bracha Ettinger's art and Matrixial theory.

Elana Dykewomon's 1976 collection of lesbian stories and poems, They Will Know Me by My Teeth, features a drawing of a Gorgon on its cover. Its purpose was to act as a guardian for female power, keeping the book solely in the hands of women. Stephen Wilk, author of Medusa: Solving the Mystery of the Gorgon, questioned Medusa's enduring status among the feminist movement. He believes that one reason for her longevity may be her role as a protector, fearsome and enraged. "Only the Gorgon has the savage, threatening appearance to serve as an immediately recognized symbol of rage and a protector of women's secrets," wrote Wilk.

Even in contemporary pop culture, Medusa has become largely synonymous with feminine rage. Through many of her iterations, Medusa pushes back against a story that seeks to place the male, Perseus, at its center, blameless and heroic. Author Sibylle Baumbach described Medusa as a “multimodal image of intoxication, petrifaction, and luring attractiveness," citing her seductive contemporary representation, as well as her dimensionality, as the reason for her longevity.

Elizabeth Johnston's November 2016 Atlantic essay called Medusa the original 'Nasty Woman.' Johnston goes on to say that as Medusa has been repeatedly compared to Hillary Clinton during the 2016 presidential election, she proves her merit as an icon, finding relevance even in modern politics. "Medusa has since haunted Western imagination, materializing whenever male authority feels threatened by female agency," writes Johnston. Beyond that, Medusa's story is, Johnston argues, a rape narrative. A story of victim blaming, one that she says sounds all too familiar in a current American context.

The Medusa story has also been interpreted in contemporary art as a classic case of rape-victim blaming, by the goddess Athena.  Inspired by the #metoo movement, contemporary figurative artist Judy Takács returns Medusa's beauty along with a hashtag stigmata in her portrait, #Me(dusa)too.

Feminist theorist Hélène Cixous famously tackled the myth in her essay "The Laugh of the Medusa." She argues that men's retelling of the narrative turned Medusa into a monster because they feared female desire. "The Laugh of the Medusa" is largely a call to arms, urging women to reclaim their identity through writing as she rejects the patriarchal society of Western culture. Cixous calls writing "an act which will not only 'realize' the decensored relation of woman to her sexuality, to her womanly being, giving her access to her native strength; it will give her back her goods, her pleasures, her organs, her immense bodily territories which have been kept under seal." She claims "we must kill the false woman who is preventing the live one from breathing. Inscribe the breath of the whole woman."  Cixous wants to destroy the phallogocentric system, and to empower women's bodies and language. "You only have to look at the Medusa straight on to see her," writes Cixous. "And she's not deadly. She's beautiful and she's laughing."

Nihilism
Medusa has sometimes appeared as representing notions of scientific determinism and nihilism, especially in contrast with romantic idealism. In this interpretation of Medusa, attempts to avoid looking into her eyes represent avoiding the ostensibly depressing reality that the universe is meaningless. Jack London uses Medusa in this way in his novel The Mutiny of the Elsinore:

Art

Medusa has been depicted in several works of art, including:

 Perseus beheading the sleeping Medusa, obverse of a terracotta pelike (jar) attributed to Polygnotos (vase painter) (c. 450 – 440 BC), collection of the Metropolitan Museum of Art
 Medusa on the breastplate of Alexander the Great, as depicted in the Alexander Mosaic from Pompeii's House of the Faun (c. 200 BC)
 Medusa column bases of Basilica Cistern in Constantinople.
The "Rondanini Medusa", a Roman copy of the Gorgoneion on the aegis of Athena; later used as a model for the Gorgon's head in Antonio Canova's marble Perseus with the Head of Medusa (1798–1801)
Medusa (oil on canvas) by Leonardo da Vinci
Perseus with the Head of Medusa (bronze sculpture) by Benvenuto Cellini (1554)
Perseus and Medusa – bronze statue by Hubert Gerhard (c. 1590)
Medusa (oil on canvas) by Caravaggio (1597)
Head of Medusa, by Peter Paul Rubens (1618)
Medusa (marble bust) by Gianlorenzo Bernini (1630s)
Medusa is played by a countertenor in Jean-Baptiste Lully and Philippe Quinault's opera, Persée (1682).  She sings the aria "J'ay perdu la beauté qui me rendit si vaine" ("I have lost the beauty that made me so vain").
Perseus Turning Phineus and his Followers to Stone (oil on canvas) by Luca Giordano (early 1680s).
Perseus with the Head of Medusa (marble sculpture) by Antonio Canova (1801)
Medusa (1854), marble sculpture by Harriet Hosmer, collection of the Detroit Institute of Art
Medusa (oil on canvas) by Arnold Böcklin (c. 1878)
Perseus (bronze sculpture) by Salvador Dalí
Medusa sculpture by Luciano Garbati, which portrays her clutching the severed head of Perseus (2008) 

Medusa remained a common theme in art in the nineteenth century, when her myth was retold in Thomas Bulfinch's Mythology. Edward Burne-Jones' Perseus Cycle of paintings and a drawing by Aubrey Beardsley gave way to the twentieth-century works of Paul Klee, John Singer Sargent, Pablo Picasso, Pierre et Gilles, and Auguste Rodin's bronze sculpture The Gates of Hell.

Flags and emblems
The head of Medusa is featured on some regional symbols. One example is that of the flag and emblem of Sicily, together with the three-legged trinacria. The inclusion of Medusa in the center implies the protection of the goddess Athena, who wore the Gorgon's likeness on her aegis, as said above. Another example is the coat of arms of Dohalice village in the Czech Republic.

Science
Medusa is honored in the following scientific names:

In popular culture

Sources

Primary myth sources
Greek:
 Hesiod, Theogony, 270 (text)
 Apollodorus, The Library, book II, part iv, no. 2-3 (text)
 Aeschylus, Prometheus Bound, 790–801 (text)

Roman:
 Ovid, Metamorphoses iv. 774–785, 790–801 (text)

Mentioned in
Greek:
 Homer, The Iliad, Book 5, line 741 (text); book 8, line 348 (text); book 11, line 36 (text)
 Homer, The Odyssey, Book 11, line 635 (text)
 Euripides, Ion, lines 1003–1023 (text)
 Apollonius Rhodius, Argonautica, book 4, line 1515 (text)

Roman:
 Publius "Virgil" Maro, Aeneid vi.289 (text)
 Lucan, The Civil War, book ix.624–684 (text)
 Valerisu Flaccus, Argonautica

See also

Citations

General references 
 Grimal, Pierre, The Dictionary of Classical Mythology, Wiley-Blackwell, 1996. .
 Hard, Robin, The Routledge Handbook of Greek Mythology: Based on H.J. Rose's "Handbook of Greek Mythology", Psychology Press, 2004, . Google Books.
 Harrison, Jane Ellen (1903) 3rd ed. 1922. Prolegomena to the Study of Greek Religion,: "The Ker as Gorgon"
 
 Ovid, Metamorphoses, Brookes More, Boston, Cornhill Publishing Co. 1922. Online version at the Perseus Digital Library.
 Ovid. Metamorphoses, Volume I: Books 1–8. Translated by Frank Justus Miller. Revised by G. P. Goold. Loeb Classical Library No. 42. Cambridge, Massachusetts: Harvard University Press, 1977, first published 1916. . Online version at Harvard University Press.
 Seelig BJ. The rape of Medusa in the temple of Athena: aspects of triangulation in the girl. Int J Psychoanal. 2002 Aug;83(Pt 4):895–911. doi: 10.1516/00207570260172975. PMID 12204171.
 Tripp, Edward, Crowell's Handbook of Classical Mythology, Thomas Y. Crowell Co; First edition (June 1970). .
 Walker, Barbara G. (1996). The Women's Encyclopedia of Myths & Secrets. New Jersey: Castle Books.  
 
 Wilk, Stephen R. (2007). Medusa: Solving the Mystery of the Gorgon. Oxford University Press.

External links

 Ancient coins depicting Medusa
 "Medusa in Myth and Literary History" – English.uiuc.edu
 Theoi Project, Medousa & the Gorgones References to Medusa and her sisters in classical literature and art

 
Gorgons
Deeds of Athena
Heraldic beasts
Libyan characters in Greek mythology
Metamorphoses characters
Metamorphoses in Greek mythology
Monsters in Greek mythology
Mythological human hybrids
Mythological rape victims
Women and death
Women in Greek mythology